The discography of British electronic musician Chicane consists of eight studio albums, three compilation albums, two extended plays and thirty-nine singles. His debut single, "Offshore" reached number fourteen in the United Kingdom and number five on the United States dance chart in 1996. The subsequent debut album, Far from the Maddening Crowds, peaked at number forty-nine in the UK.

Chicane had his commercial breakthrough with the album Behind the Sun, released on 27 March 2000. It sold over 100,000 copies and was certified gold in the UK, and spawned the hit singles "Saltwater" and "Don't Give Up". "Saltwater" sampled "Theme from Harry's Game" by Irish group Clannad and became a popular track in nightclubs across Europe; it reached number six in the UK and charted in countries such as Australia, Ireland and the Netherlands. "Don't Give Up" was a collaboration with Canadian singer Bryan Adams. It became a number one hit in the UK and a top 20 hit in the United States, Australia, Finland and Belgium.

On 23 July 2007 Chicane released his third studio album, Somersault on his own record label, Modena. The lead single, released in 2006, "Stoned in Love" featured Welsh singer Tom Jones and reached number seven in the UK. In 2009 Chicane released a cover version of "Hoppípolla" by Icelandic band Sigur Rós, titled "Poppiholla", which became his fourth top 10 hit in the UK. Chicane released his fourth studio album, Giants on 2 August 2010. Less radio friendly singles includes "Right Here Right Now", "Footprint" and "Nagasaki Badger" under the Disco Citizens alias. Released from 1995 to 1998 and initially a collaboration with producer Leo Elstob, all three charted within the top 60 in the UK.

Albums

Studio albums

Compilation albums

Other albums

Extended plays

Singles

As lead artist

Notes

 A Scheduled to be the third studio album, Easy to Assemble was never commercially released due to an internet leak of promotional copies.

as Disco Citizens

as Sitvac

References

Discographies of British artists
Electronic music discographies